Nogometni Klub Žepče 1919 is a football club from Žepče, Bosnia and Herzegovina.

The home stadium is called Žepče Gradski Stadion (Žepče City Stadium) with a capacity of 4,000. The team plays in the fourth tier League of Zenica-Doboj Canton. The team's colours are blue and white.

History 
Žepče changed their name several times. The team competed the most under the name Orlovik, and recorded the greatest successes as Žepče, playing from 2002 to 2008 in the Premier League of Bosnia and Herzegovina. 
The team was known as NK Zovko Žepče, until 2003, when Limorad became their primary sponsor.
In 2019 Žepče celebrated 100 years of foundation with a friendly match against GNK Dinamo Zagreb.

Honours

Domestic

League
First League of the Federation of Bosnia and Herzegovina:
Winners (1): 2001–02

European record

Managerial history
  Marijan Zovko (2001–2002)
  Pavao Strugačevac
  Marin Bloudek
  Mario Ćutuk
  Nikola Nikić (2005–2007)
  Ilija Šainović 
  Tado Tomas
  Goran Brašnić
  Damir Hadžić

References

External links
Žepče on UEFA.com
Official site on NK Žepče
Information on NK Žepče Limorad 

Zepce
Zepce
Sport in the Federation of Bosnia and Herzegovina
Zepce
Zepce
Žepče
1919 establishments in Bosnia and Herzegovina
2010 disestablishments in Bosnia and Herzegovina